Matteo Gerace (born 27 August 2001) is an Italian footballer who plays as a midfielder for Serie D club Crema.

Career

Alessandria
A product of the club's youth academy, Gerace made his senior debut for the club on 16 December 2018, coming on as a 79th-minute substitute for Tommaso Tentoni in a 0–0 draw with Pro Patria. In July 2019, he signed his first professional contract with Alessandria.

Loan to Siena
On 22 September 2020, he joined Serie D club Siena on loan.

Loan to Borgosesia
On 24 February 2021, he was loaned to Borgosesia, again in Serie D.

Fiorenzuola
On 31 January 2022, Gerace moved to Serie C club Fiorenzuola on a permanent basis with a contract until the end of the season.

Crema
On 12 August 2022, Gerace signed with Crema in Serie D.

References

External links

2001 births
Living people
U.S. Alessandria Calcio 1912 players
A.C.N. Siena 1904 players
U.S. Fiorenzuola 1922 S.S. players
A.C. Crema 1908 players
Serie C players
Serie D players
Italian footballers
Association football midfielders